Enduring Quests and Daring Visions is a vision for astrophysics programs chartered by then-Director of NASA's Astrophysics Division, Paul Hertz, and released in late 2013. It lays out plans over 30 years as long-term goals and missions. Goals include mapping the Cosmic Microwave Background and finding Earth like exoplanets, to go deeper into space-time studying the Large Scale Structure of the Universe, extreme physics, and looking back farther in time. The panel that produced the vision included many notable American astrophysicists, including: Chryssa Kouveliotou, Eric Agol, Natalie Batalha, Misty Bentz, Alan Dressler,  Scott Gaudi, Olivier Guyon, Enectali Figueroa-Feliciano, Feryal Ozel, Aki Roberge, Amber Straughn, and Joan Centrella.

Examples of discussed missions include:
Astro-H (Hitomi)
Black Hole Mapper
CMB Polarization Surveyor
Cosmic Dawn
Euclid
 ExoEarth Mapper
Gaia
Gravitational Wave Surveyor/Mapper
Habitable Exoplanet Imaging Mission (HabEx)
Far-Infrared Surveyor (later renamed the Origins Space Telescope)
JEM-EUSO
James Webb Space Telescope (JWST)
Large UV Optical Infrared Surveyor (LUVOIR)
Nancy Grace Roman Space Telescope
Neutron Star Interior Composition Explorer (NICER)
Transiting Exoplanet Survey Satellite (TESS)
X-Ray Surveyor (later renamed the Lynx X-ray Observatory)

References

External links
Enduring Quests and Daring Visions (NASA) (.pdf)

Astrophysics
2013 in space